Roll ball is a game played between two teams and is a unique combination of roller skates, basketball, handball, and throwball. It is played on "roller shoes" with each team consisting of twelve players, six on the field and six in reserve. The main objective of the game is to score maximum goals within a stipulated time. The main feature of Roll Ball is that the ball is held in one or both hands, when passing to the other players, with the ball repeatedly bounced on the ground.

History
The game was invented by Raju Dabhade of Pune, India, while he was the sports teacher at MES Bal Shikshan Mandir, an English medium school. Dabhade is also Secretary of the International Roll Ball Federation (IRBF).

Rules and equipment 
The roll-ball can be used by more than one player in the game. It is not an individual equipment.

Inline roller skates or Quad Skates are needed, plus a Helmet, knee pads, and other forms of protective guards.

Playing court 
The court includes a center-line dividing offensive and defensive areas. The penalty line is drawn 4.5 m or 3.5 m away from the goal. Free Throw line or Goalkeeper's line or D arena is 3.5 m to 2.5 m away from the goal. The playing court is marked by 5 cm boundary line. All other lines are marked by red or white color. The court is any hard surface. A 3-meter line is drawn as a safety margin outside the boundary line. The goal is 2.25 meters wide by 2.00 meters height.

Roll Ball World Cup

2011 World Cup

Inauguration 
The 1st Roll Ball World Cup was inaugurated by the Mayor of Pune, Mohansingh Rajpal. The Opening Ceremony started with lighting of the lamp representing Indian Culture.  A dance was performance by the dancer Parimal Phadke and his group set the tone of the Opening Ceremony.  Following it was a performance by Milind Date accompanied by Devdatta Phadke. Next, there were two more performances by the Sphinx Adonis group and a group dance related to India.  The Opening Ceremony ended with a demonstration match of Roll Ball. The competition began on 17 April and ended on 22 April 2011.

2013 World Cup
The 2nd Roll Ball World Cup was held from 3 October to 6 October 2013, at MOI International Sports Centre, Kasarani, Nairobi, Kenya.  The event was organized by Kenya Roll Ball Federation, Africa Roll Ball Federation and Ministry of Youth Affairs and Sports Kenya under the aegis of International Roll Ball Federation. This event was organized in both Men's and Women's categories. The championship was declared open by Mr. Gordon Olouch Commissioner of Sports, Kenya.

2015 World Cup

Preparations 
The preparations for this world cup began almost a year ahead with the logo for the championship being launched on 11 October 2015. The inauguration was held at  the banquet hall of Hotel Marriot, S. B. Road, Pune.

Opening ceremony 
The 3rd Roll Ball World Cup was inaugurated by the Mayor of Pune, Dattatray Dhankawde. This was followed by a march by all the participants from different countries, Ganesh Vandana was performed by dancers of Surabhee Cultural Academy, the classical dancers of Sanskriti Kala Manch, and the students of Bal Shikshan Mandir School, Mahesh Vidyalaya, Ryan International School, followed by a demonstration of yoga. The dance performances were followed by singing performance of the students of Blind School Pune.

Teams 
The Opening Ceremony ended with the first league match in the women's category. A very important tradition of the IRBF began this year with the slogan "Women’s match in respect to Woman Power".  This was a gesture by the IRBF to give importance to Women empowerment. Out of the 32 confirmed teams, 26 countries participated in this championship which were Argentina, Bangladesh, Belarus, Benin, Bhutan, China, Denmark, Egypt, England, Fiji, India, Indonesia, Iran, Kenya, Latvia, Malaysia, Nepal, Netherlands, New Zealand, Russia, Senegal,  Singapore, Slovenia, Sri Lanka, Uganda and Zambia. Six countries could not participate due to technical problems.

The League matches started on 15 December and were played until 20 December.  The women's semifinal and men's quarterfinal matches were played on Saturday, 19 December. The Prize distribution of the Women's event was done by Swarn Singh Chhabda -Secretary Sports Authority of India among some notable names.

The men's semifinal matches were played on Sunday, 20 December. Shri Anil Shirole, MP Pune City, distributed prizes, accompanied by Penninah Kabenge, President of the International Roll Ball Federation.

Final remarks 
Another important gesture by the I.R.B.F. was the Social Aspect brought to the Championship by giving an opportunity for blind children to perform during the opening ceremony. A "Wheelchair Roll Ball" match was demonstrated by the Paraplegic Rehabilitation Center of the Indian Army. The BBC aired the cup on various global stations.

2017 World Cup

Preparations and selection process 
The 4th Roll Ball World Cup was held at Dhaka Bangladesh from 17 to 23 February 2017.  Both the Indian Men and Women's teams participated in this World Cup. The preparations for this world cup began almost 3 months back with the selection process of the Indian Team.  Senior players who participated in the Roll Ball National Championship were invited for the selection trials.  In total 68 male and 28 female participants joined the selection process. The selection process included anthropomorphic measurements and 8 different physical fitness and skill tests. Out the participants, 20 players each were selected for the training for 10 days which was organized at the Shiv Chhatrapati Sports Complex, Pune.  The final Indian teams were selected from this camp.

Inauguration 
The 4th Roll Ball World Cup was inaugurated by AHM Mustafa Kamal, the Minister of Planning Govt. of the Peoples' Republic of Bangladesh, among many notable names.

Around 590 players, 100 Officials, and 200 Scout Cadets from a total of 39 countries situated across Asia, Africa, Europe, Oceania and South America took part in the Roll Ball World Cup 2017. The World Cup matches were played at three different venues - Shaikh Russel Roll Ball Stadium, Hand Ball Stadium and Mirpur Indoor Stadium. The opening & closing ceremonies were held at the Sheikh Russel Roller Skating Complex at Paltan Maidan Dhaka Bangladesh.

Teams 
The men's team were India, Ivory Coast, England, Sierra Leone, Oman, Iran, Argentina, Egypt, Uganda, Tanzania, Latvia, Pakistan, Guinea, Indonesia, Rwanda, Bangladesh, Bhutan, Myanmar, Fiji, Hong Kong, Nepal, Benin, France, Thailand, China, Kenya, Denmark, Sri Lanka, Senegal, Philippines, Belarus, Uruguay, Saudi Arabia, Turkey, Zambia, Chinese Taipei, Netherlands, Vietnam.

The women's team were; Kenya, England, Thailand, Indonesia, India, Slovenia, Egypt, Sierra Leone, Iran, Pakistan, China, Tanzania, Bangladesh, Nepal, Philippines, Sri Lanka, Rwanda, Zambia, Argentina, Denmark, Turkey, Latvia, Uruguay, Benin, Uganda, Senegal, Chinese Taipei.

The Prize distribution of the Men's and Women world cup was done by the Prime Minister of Bangladesh, Sheikh Hasina in the presence of Mr. Abdul Hamid – President Peoples Republic of Bangladesh Dhaka, Mr. AHM Mustafa Kamal – Minister of Planning Govt. of Peoples Republic of Bangladesh among many others. In the 4th Roll Ball World Cup all 113 matches were broadcast live.

Results

The Stadium 
The Shaikh Russel Stadium was built in 75 day's record time with solar panels on top of the roof by the Bangladesh government specially for Roll Ball World Cup. All World Cup venues and accommodation area were given free Wi-Fi network along with high security.

2019 World Cup

Inauguration 
The Inauguration Function was held on 15 November 2019 at ICF Indoor Stadium.  V.V.Moorthy, ME, MBA, Member of State Advisory Committee, Youth Welfare and Sports Development Department was the Chief Guest.

Teams 
In this World Cup, 28 countries participated. The men's team countries were Bangladesh, Belarus, Canada, France, Guinea,  Ivory Coast (Ivoirian), Kenya, Latvia, Nepal, New Zealand, Poland, Sierra Leone, Singapore, Sri Lanka, Uganda, England, Oman, Saudi Arabia, India, the Netherlands, Egypt, China, Vietnam, Senegal, Argentina, Uruguay & Iran.

The women's team countries were Bangladesh, Guinea, Ivory Coast, Kenya, Latvia, Male, Nepal, Poland, Sierra Leone, Sri Lanka, Uganda, England, India, the Netherlands, Egypt, China, Senegal & Iran.

Results

References

External links
 International Roll Ball Federation (Official Site)
 Roll Ball rules from IRBF

 
Team sports
Ball games